Tong Tso or Dong Co (）is a plateau lake in Gêrzê County, Tibet Autonomous Region. The name of lake means "Desolate Lake" in Standard Tibetan. The lake has a total area of about 87.7 square kilometers. Lying at an elevation of 4,396  metres, it is dotted with two islands.

Maps

Notes

Ngari Prefecture
Lakes of Tibet